The Canterbury charm is an Old Norse runic charm discovered inserted in the margin of an Anglo-Saxon manuscript from the year 1073.

Inscription
The runes are clear, and the transliteration of the runes is straight-forward (spaces between words not present in the original):
kuril sarþuara far þu nu funtin is tu þur uigi þik ¶ þorsa trutin iuril sarþuara uiþr aþra uari ·

Gustavson (2010) normalizes it as
Gyrils sārþvara far þū nū! Fundinn eʀ þū! Þōrr vīgi þik, þursa drōttinn, Gyrils sārþvara. Viðr aðravari.

and translates it as
Gyrill's wound-tap, you go now! You are found! May Thor hallow you, lord of the trolls. Gyrill's wound-tap. Against pus in the veins (blood poisoning).

Similarly, the charm is translated by Macleod and Mees (2006) as:
Gyril wound-causer, go now! You are found. May Thor bless you, lord of ogres! Gyril wound-causer. Against blood-vessel pus!

Interpretation
The charm is intended for use against a specific ailment, described as "blood-vessel pus." MacLeod and Mees note that while Thor is not revered in surviving sources for his medical abilities, he was well attested as harboring enmity towards giants and as a protector of mankind. MacLeod and Mees compare the charm to the 11th-century Kvinneby amulet (where Thor is also called upon to provide protection), the formula structure of the Sigtuna amulet I, and the inscription on a then-recently discovered rib bone also from Sigtuna, Sweden.

Notes

References
 Gustavson, Helmer. (2010) Sårfeberbenet från Sigtuna. Situne Dei, 61-76. Relevant parts translated from Swedish by Mindy MacLeod.
 Macleod, Mindy. Mees, Bernard (2006). Runic Amulets and Magic Objects. Boydell Press

External links
 Cotton MS Caligula A XV

Runic inscriptions
Historical runic magic
Norse paganism
Sources on Germanic paganism